Fuligni is a surname. Notable people with the surname include:

 Bruno Fuligni (born 1968), French writer and historian
 Federico Fuligni (born 1995), Italian motorcycle racer